Wiremu Tako Ngātata (1815 – 8 November 1887) was a New Zealand Te Āti Awa leader, peacemaker and politician.

He was appointed to the New Zealand Legislative Council on 11 October 1872; he was (with Mokena Kohere) one of the first two Māori to become a member. He served on the Legislative Council until his death on 8 November 1887. Later in his life Wi Tako converted to Roman Catholicism.

References

1815 births
1887 deaths
Members of the New Zealand Legislative Council
Māori MLCs
Māori politicians
Te Āti Awa people
Converts to Roman Catholicism
New Zealand Roman Catholics
19th-century New Zealand politicians